This article contains information about the literary events and publications of 1546.

Events
July 17 – Peter Faber, appointed by Pope Paul III to act as a peritus on behalf of the Holy See at the Council of Trent, arrives in Rome; exhausted by his journey; he dies a fortnight later.
unknown date – Francisco de Moraes visits Paris for the second time, obtaining inspiration for his Palmerin d'Angleterre.

New books

Prose
Sir John Prise of Brecon (anonymously) – Yn y lhyvyr hwnn (first book printed in Welsh)
François Rabelais – Le Tiers Livre

Drama
Sperone Speroni – Canace (published)

Poetry
See 1546 in poetry

Births
March 27 – Johannes Piscator, German theologian (died 1625)
May 21 – Madeleine de l'Aubespine, French poet and patron (died 1596)
October 5 – Cyriakus Schneegass, German Lutheran pastor, composer and music theorist (died 1597)
unknown dates
Philippe Desportes, French poet (died 1606)
Pierre de La Primaudaye, French Protestant writer (died 1619)
Veronica Franco, Venetian poet and courtesan (died 1591)
Daniel Adam z Veleslavína, Czech lexicographer, publisher and writer (died 1599)

Deaths
February 18 – Martin Luther, German theologian and reformer, 62
April 7 – Friedrich Myconius, German Lutheran theologian, 55
August 1 – Peter Faber, French Jesuit theologian, 40
August 3 – Étienne Dolet, French humanist writer and printer, 37 (executed for heresy)

References

Years of the 16th century in literature